Gene Palumbo (November 10, 1945 – October 10, 2000) was an American television producer and writer.

Career
Palumbo served as the head writer of the CBS Daytime soap opera Guiding Light with L. Virginia Browne from 1982 to 1983, where he won a 1982 Daytime Emmy Award for Outstanding Drama Series Writing.

He later co-created Rituals, which ran from 1984 to 1985.

Palumbo was the head writer of  the ABC Daytime serial General Hospital from 1989 to 1991, replacing Ann Marcus after the 1988 Writers Guild of America strike. He was himself replaced in 1991 with Norma Monty, the sister of Executive Producer and former head writer Gloria Monty, who had returned to the series in 1990. Palumbo then served as head writer for NBC Daytime's Days of Our Lives from June 19, 1991 to August 6, 1992. He was hired by Ken Corday in March 1991.

Awards and nominations
Daytime Emmy Awards

WINS
(1982; Best Writing; Guiding Light)

Writers Guild of America Award

NOMINATIONS 
(1992 seasons; Days of Our Lives)

HW history

References

External links

1945 births
2000 deaths
20th-century American male actors
American soap opera writers
Soap opera producers
Place of birth missing
Place of death missing
American male soap opera actors
Daytime Emmy Award winners
American male television writers
20th-century American screenwriters
20th-century American male writers